Zhang Ji (died 223), courtesy name Derong, was an official who lived during the late Eastern Han dynasty and early Three Kingdoms period of China. During the Battle of Tong Pass, Zhang Ji, Xiahou Yuan and others defended the city of Chang'an from attacks by the warlord Ma Chao and his allies. From 213 to 220, Zhang Ji served as the Inspector of Yong Province. In 220, after the Han dynasty ended and the Three Kingdoms period started, Zhang Ji served under the state of Cao Wei as the Inspector of Liang Province. He earned some merit for his administration during this time. His son, Zhang Ji (Jingzhong), also served as an official in the Cao Wei state.

See also
 Lists of people of the Three Kingdoms

Notes

References

General references
 Chen, Shou (3rd century). Records of the Three Kingdoms (Sanguozhi).
 Pei, Songzhi (5th century). Annotations to Records of the Three Kingdoms (Sanguozhi zhu).

Year of birth unknown
223 deaths
Cao Wei politicians
Politicians from Xi'an
Mayors of Xi'an
Political office-holders in Gansu
Han dynasty politicians from Shaanxi